Sunbeam School Mughalsarai 
 AF . Duty Devotion and Discipline

Information

A fleet of buses bring the children from Mughalsarai and its adjacent areas. The school has about 55 teachers and 1600 students. 
The school has two buildings one for junior classes and another for senior classes.

References

External links

High schools and secondary schools in Uttar Pradesh
Pandit Deen Dayal Upadhyaya Nagar
Educational institutions established in 2005
2005 establishments in Uttar Pradesh